"Before It's Too Late (Sam and Mikaela's Theme)" or simply "Before It's Too Late" is a song from the Transformers soundtrack, Transformers: The Album, and the 25th single by the Goo Goo Dolls. It was released on June 5, 2007. The song itself was the first single to be released for the soundtrack reaching 86 on Billboard Hot 100 and 9 on Hot Adult Top 40, although the song, "What I've Done" by Linkin Park was written and used for most of the Transformers promotional purposes. The song was later included on the band's second compilation album Greatest Hits Volume One: The Singles.

Track listing

 "Before It's Too Late (Sam And Mikaela's Theme)" - 3:02

Chart positions

Weekly charts

Year-end charts

References 

2007 singles
Goo Goo Dolls songs
Songs written by John Rzeznik
Songs from Transformers (film series)
Rock ballads
2007 songs